Henry Poole (by 15261580) was an English politician.

He was a Member (MP) of the Parliament of England for Wootton Bassett during October 1553.

References

Year of birth missing
1580 deaths
English MPs 1553 (Mary I)